Jamal Itani ( Arabic: جمال عيتاني) is a politician, businessman, civil servant and owner of Levant Holding. He is the mayor of Beirut, Lebanon.

Career 

Before becoming mayor, he was appointed by Prime Minister Rafic Hariri as President of the Council for Development and Reconstruction of Lebanon from 2001 to 2005. He initiated and oversaw the building and management of Amman's new downtown, New Abdali, from 2005 to 2009 while serving as CEO of the Abdali Company. He then went to Saudi Arabia to work with a leading Saudi construction company doing major projects in the defense industry. In 2014, he returned to Lebanon and became GM of Solidere. Jamal Itani was elected as Mayor of Beirut in 2016 for 6 years and serves as the President of the Committee of the Lebanese Mayors.

Itani holds a civil engineering degree from Georgetown University and a master's degree in civil engineering from the University of Pennsylvania.

References

Living people
1960 births
21st-century Lebanese politicians
Businesspeople in construction
Date of birth missing (living people)
Place of birth missing (living people)